Stary Ciepielów  is a village in the administrative district of Gmina Ciepielów, within Lipsko County, Masovian Voivodeship, in east-central Poland.

On December, 6, 1942, German Gendarmerie murdered twenty-one Poles from Stary Ciepielów who were suspected of aiding the Jewish refuges. Women and children were among the victims. Also, two Jews were executed.

References

Villages in Lipsko County